Meeruthiya Gangsters is a 2015 Indian Hindi-language crime-comedy film written and directed by Zeishan Quadri and produced by Gibran Noorani. The film score is composed by Vivek Kar and Siddhant Mishra. Meeruthiya Gangsters was released on 18 September 2015. It is inspired by the high number of extortion cases in Meerut, Uttar Pradesh. The film is based from the perspective of six youths who turn kidnappers. The first look poster was released on 29 July 2015, followed by the trailer on 10 August 2015.

Cast
Jaideep Ahlawat as Nikhil
Aakash Dahiya as Amit
Vansh Bhardwaj as Gagan
Chandrachoor Rai as Rahul 'Challenger'
Shadab Kamal as Sunny
Jatin Sarna as Sanjay 'Foreigner'
Nushrat Bharucha as Mansi
Ishita Raj Sharma as Pooja
Sanjay Mishra as Mama
Mukul Dev as R K Singh
Brijendra Kala as Jayantilal
Sumit Sethi as DJ Sumit
Alok Sharma 
Sachin Shivalia

Soundtrack
Album consists of 8 tracks composed by Siddhant Mishra, Vivek Kar and Siddhant Madhav. Lyrics penned by Kumaar, Kunwar Juneja and Arafat Mehmood. Suresh Raina, Indian sensational cricketer, lent his voice to the song – "Tu Mili Sab Mila", in this film.

References

Further reading

External links

2010s Hindi-language films
Indian crime comedy films
Films scored by Vivek Kar
Films set in Uttar Pradesh
Films shot in Uttar Pradesh